Richard Jay Potash (June 26, 1946 – November 24, 2018), known professionally as Ricky Jay, was an American stage magician, actor and writer. In a profile for The New Yorker, Mark Singer called Jay "perhaps the most gifted sleight of hand artist alive". In addition to sleight of hand, he was known for his card tricks, card throwing, memory feats, and stage patter. He also wrote extensively on magic and its history. His acting credits included the films The Prestige, The Spanish Prisoner, Mystery Men, Heist, Boogie Nights, Tomorrow Never Dies, State and Main, House of Games and Magnolia, and the HBO series Deadwood. In 2015 he was the subject of an episode of PBS's American Masters, the only magician ever profiled in the series.

Early life
Jay was born in the New York City borough of Brooklyn to Shirley (Katz) and Samuel Potash. A member of a middle-class Jewish family, he grew up in Elizabeth, New Jersey. He rarely spoke publicly about his parents, but did share an anecdote: "My father oiled his hair with Brylcreem and brushed his teeth with Colgate," Jay recalled. "He kept his toothpaste in the medicine cabinet and the Brylcreem in a closet about a foot away. Once, when I was ten, I switched the tubes. All you need to know about my father is that after he brushed his teeth with Brylcreem he put the toothpaste in his hair."

During an interview on the National Public Radio program Fresh Air with Terry Gross, Jay said that possibly "the only kind memory I ever had of my parents" was when they secretly hired one of his idols, magician Al Flosso, to perform at his bar mitzvah. Jay's grandfather, Max Katz, was a certified public accountant and amateur magician who introduced Jay to magic.

Career

Magician

Jay first performed in public at the age of seven, in 1953, when he appeared on the television program Time For Pets. He is most likely the youngest magician to perform a full magic act on TV, the first magician to ever play comedy clubs, and probably the first magician to open for a rock and roll band. At New York's Electric Circus in the 1960s, he performed on a bill between Ike and Tina Turner and Timothy Leary, who lectured about LSD.

During the 1960s and 70s, Jay lived in Ithaca, New York, performing while also intermittently attending the Cornell University School of Hotel Administration, but later moved to the Los Angeles area.

He quickly developed a following among magic aficionados, and a reputation for sleight-of-hand feats that baffled even his colleagues. In his 1993 New Yorker profile of Jay, Mark Singer related the following story from playwright David Mamet and theater director Gregory Mosher:

Three of Jay's one-man shows, Ricky Jay and His 52 Assistants, Ricky Jay: On the Stem, and Ricky Jay: A Rogue's Gallery, were directed by Mamet, who also cast Jay in a number of his films.

A collector and historian, Jay was a student and friend of Dai Vernon, whom he called "the greatest living contributor to the magical art." He collected rare books and manuscripts, art, and other artifacts connected to the history of magic, gambling, unusual entertainments, and frauds and confidence games. Jay opposed any public revelations of the techniques of magic.

He could throw a playing card into a watermelon rind (which he referred to as the "thick, pachydermatous outer melon layer" and "the most prodigious of household fruits") from ten paces. In addition, he was able to throw a card into the air like a boomerang and cut it cleanly in half with a pair of "giant scissors" upon its return. In his shows, he often attacked plastic animals with thrown cards in "self defense."

Actor
Jay appeared in a number of David Mamet films including House of Games, The Spanish Prisoner and Redbelt; he also appeared in a few episodes of the Mamet-produced TV series The Unit as a C.I.A. recruiter.

Jay played Henry Gupta, a henchman to villain Elliot Carver, in the James Bond film Tomorrow Never Dies; and appeared in Paul Thomas Anderson's Boogie Nights and Magnolia, as well as Christopher Nolan's The Prestige.

He joined the cast of the HBO western drama Deadwood as a recurring character and writer for the first season in 2004, playing card shark Eddie Sawyer. He wrote the episode "Jewel's Boot Is Made for Walking" and left the series at the end of the first season.

Consultant
As an expert on magic, gambling, con games and unusual entertainment, Jay was a consultant on Hollywood projects for many years, beginning with his work on Francis Ford Coppola's production of Caleb Deschanel's The Escape Artist. Other early work included teaching Robert Redford how to manipulate coins for The Natural and working with Douglas Trumbull on his Showscan project New Magic (1983).

In the early 1990s, Jay and Michael Weber created a firm, Deceptive Practices, providing "Arcane Knowledge on a Need-to-Know Basis" to film, television and stage productions. By offering both vast historical expertise and creative invention, they were able to provide surprising practical solutions to real production challenges. Among many accomplishments, they designed the wheelchair that "magically" hid Gary Sinise's legs in Forrest Gump; the glass that "drinks itself" used by the gorilla in Congo; and an illusion "in which a man climbs to the top of a ladder of light and vanishes in midair" for the Broadway production of Angels in America: Perestroika.

Other projects they worked on included The Prestige, The Illusionist, Sneakers, Leap of Faith, Wolf, The Parent Trap, I Love Trouble, The Great Buck Howard, Heartbreakers, and Ocean's Thirteen.

Additionally, he worked with libraries and museums on their collections, including the Mulholland Library of Conjuring and the Allied Arts and the Museum of Jurassic Technology in Culver City, California.

Lectures and exhibitions
Jay authored numerous articles and delivered many lectures and demonstrations on such subjects as conjuring literature, con games, sense perception, and unusual entertainments. Among his presentations:

 "Sleight and Shadow", at the New York Metropolitan Museum of Art 
 "Belknap Visitor in the Humanities" lecture on the relationship between magicians and mediums, at Princeton University 
 "Doing Likewise: Imitation, Emulation, and Mimesis", at the New York Institute of Humanities, hosted by Jonathan Miller.
 "Hocus Pocus in Perfection: Four Hundred Years of Conjuring and Conjuring Literature," the Harold Smith Memorial Lecture at Brown University.
  "Splendors of Decaying Celluloid", with Errol Morris, Rosamond Purcell and Bill Morrison at the New York Institute for the Humanities.
 "The Origins of the Confidence Game", at the conference of Police Against Confidence Crime.
 "Chirosophi: Sixteenth and Seventeenth Century Conjuring Literature," at the Henry E. Huntington Library in San Marino, California.
 "Fast and Loose: The Techniques and Literature of Cheating", at the William Andrew Clark Memorial Library, UCLA.
 "The Mystery of Fasting Impostors," and "The Avant Garde Art of Armless Calligraphers", at Amherst College.
 "Sense, Perception, & Nonsense" at the University of Rhode Island Festival of the Arts.
 "Illusion as Truth", at the International Design Conference in Aspen (keynote address).
 "Prose & Cons: The Early Literature of Cheating", at the New York Public Library (Pforzheimer Lecture Series) and the Chicago Humanities Festival.
 "Magic & Science", at the TED Conference in Monterey, California.

Jay also lectured at Harvard University, USC, the Grolier Club, the Hammer Museum, Getty Center, and Town Hall Theatre in New York City. In 1999 he guest-curated an exhibit at the Harvard Theater Collection entitled "The Imagery of Illusion: Nineteenth Century Magic and Deception."

Exhibitions of material from his collections have been mounted at the Hammer Museum, the Yerba Buena Center for the Arts, University of California, Davis, the Christine Burgin Gallery, the Museum of Jurassic Technology, and UCLA's Clark Library. He loaned material to the Getty Center for their exhibit "Devices of Wonder" the Skirball Museum, the Huntington Library, the Whitney Museum of Art, and the Metropolitan Museum of Art for an exhibit entitled "Wordplay: Matthias Buchinger's Drawings From the Collection of Ricky Jay" in 2016.

Documentary film 
Jay is the subject of the feature documentary Deceptive Practice: The Mysteries and Mentors of Ricky Jay.

Death
Jay died on November 24, 2018 at age 72. His attorney Stan Coleman confirmed his death; further details were not immediately released. Later press coverage reported that Jay died of natural causes.

Credits

Film
 House of Games (1987) – George / Vegas Man
 Things Change (1988) – Mr. Silver
 Homicide (1991) – Aaron
 Leap of Faith (1992) – Cons and Frauds Consultant
 The Spanish Prisoner (1997) – George Lang
 Boogie Nights (1997) – Kurt Longjohn
 Hacks (1997) – The Hat
 Tomorrow Never Dies (1997) – Henry Gupta
 Mystery Men (1999) – Vic Weems
 Magnolia (1999) – Burt Ramsey / Narrator
 State and Main (2000) – Jack
 Heartbreakers (2001) – Dawson's Auctioneer
 Heist (2001) – Don "Pinky" Pincus
 Incident at Loch Ness (2004) – Party Guest #5
 Last Days (2005) – Detective
 The Prestige (2006) – Milton
 The Great Buck Howard (2008) – Gil Bellamy
 Redbelt (2008) – Marty Brown
 The Brothers Bloom (2008) – Narrator (voice)
 Intense (2009) – John
 The Automatic Hate (2015) – Uncle Josh (final film role)

Television
The Tonight Show Starring Johnny Carson (October 26, 1970)
Doug Henning's World of Magic II (December 1976)
Saturday Night Live (1977)
The Ricky Jay Magic Show – BBC special (1978)
Dinah! (July 11, 1979)
The John Davidson Show (November 28, 1980)
Simon & Simon –  Bird (1983)
The Paul Daniels Magic Show (1985)
Arsenio (1988)
Learned Pigs and Fireproof Women – 1 hour special for American TV (1989)
The Secret Cabaret (two series made by Open Media for Channel 4, UK)
D.L. Hughley Breaks the News (January 10, 1990)
Civil Wars – Lenny NiCastro (November 11, 1991)
Late Show with David Letterman (1994, 2013)
 The Ranger, the Cook and a Hole in the Sky – Hawkes (1995)
Ricky Jay and His 52 Assistants – 1 hour version of his Off-Broadway show, taped for HBO (1996)
Hustlers, Hoaxsters, Pranksters, Jokesters and Ricky Jay (1996)
American Masters – "Richard Avedon: Darkness and Light" (1996)
Late Night with Conan O'Brien (1998, 2002)
The X-Files – The Amazing Maleeni / Herman Pinchbeck / Albert Pinchbeck in "The Amazing Maleeni" (2000)
MythBusters – Episode 20, "Exploding Jawbreaker, Static Cannon, Deadly Playing Cards." Jay demonstrated card throwing, and the speed of his throws was clocked. (2003)
Deadwood – Eddie Sawyer (2004), Season 1
Kidnapped – Roger Prince (2006–07)
The Unit – Agent Kern (2007–09)
Lie to Me – Mason Brock (2009)
FlashForward – Man in Warehouse / Ted Flosso (2009–10)
60 Minutes – Interviewed by Morley Safer for segment, "Pigeon Fever" (2010)
The Simpsons – plays himself in episode "The Great Simpsina" (2011)
Teen Titans Go! – plays voice in Robin's head in episode "The Date" (2013)
The Tonight Show Starring Jimmy Fallon (March 31, 2014)
Getting On – Thoracic Surgeon (2014)
Sneaky Pete – T.H. Vignetti (2019)

Theater
A Midsummer Night's Dream (1982); produced by Joseph Papp for The New York Shakespeare Festival.
Ricky Jay & His 52 Assistants (1994)
Ricky Jay: On The Stem (2002)
Ricky Jay: A Rogue's Gallery (2009)

He also performed on the 2005 BBC Radio adaptation of David Mamet's Faustus.

Books
Jay was the author of eleven books:

 Cards as Weapons. Image Graphiques (1977). .
 Learned Pigs & Fireproof Women. Villard (1986). .
 Many Mysteries Unraveled: Conjuring Literature in America 1786–1874. Antiquarian Society (1990). ASIN B00FFJ0402.
 The Magic Magic Book. Whitney Museum Library Associates (1994). ASIN B004ONUJP0.
 Jay's Journal of Anomalies. Farrar, Straus and Giroux (2001). .
 Dice: Deception, Fate, and Rotten Luck. Quantuck Lane Press (2002). .
 Extraordinary Exhibitions: Broadsides from the Collection of Ricky Jay. Quantuck Lane Press (2005). .
 Ricky Jay Plays Poker (Audio CD). Sony Legacy (2007). ASIN B000HT2MB4.
 Magic: 1400s–1950s (with Mike Caveney, Jim Steinmeyer) Taschen (2009). .
 Celebrations of Curious Characters. McSweeney (2010). .
 Matthias Buchinger: "The Greatest German Living". Siglio (2016).

Charles McGrath called Jay "perhaps the last of the great 19th-century authors." Jay's last book, Matthias Buchinger: "The Greatest German Living", was well-received, called "awe-inspiring" by the Los Angeles Times and "beguiling" by the New York Review of Books.

Music
Ricky Jay contributed to several projects in the music world, most notably the 2007 Sony release Ricky Jay Plays Poker, a box set containing a CD of poker-related songs (by Bob Dylan, Robert Johnson, Townes Van Zandt, Patsy Cline, Lorne Greene, Howard Da Silva, O.V. Wright, and several others), a DVD featuring Ricky Jay discussing and performing notable feats of card table deception, and a box of Ricky Jay playing cards.

He performed "The Fiddler" with Richard Greene on Hal Willner's sea shanty-compilation Rogue's Gallery: Pirate Ballads, Sea Songs, and Chanteys (2006), as well as "The Chantey of Noah and his Ark (Old School Song)" on its follow-up Son of Rogues Gallery: Pirate Ballads, Sea Songs & Chanteys (2013).

He appeared in the music video for Bob Dylan's song "Tweedle Dee & Tweedle Dum," from the album Love and Theft. During the production of the video, a screwdriver reportedly fell from the rafters and lodged in Jay's hand.

He also appeared in the video for the Jerry Garcia and David Grisman single "The Thrill Is Gone," which is available on the DVD of the Grateful Dawg documentary.

References

External links

 
 Ricky Jay Archive at the Magic Newswire website
 
 San Francisco Chronicle review of "Extraordinary Exhibitions: Broadsides From the Collection of Ricky Jay" during 2005 exhibition
 "Secrets of Magus" 1993 New Yorker profile

1946 births
2018 deaths
American magicians
Card magic
Cornell University alumni
Historians of magic
Jewish American male actors
Magic consultants
Obie Award recipients
Sleight of hand
Male actors from New York City
American male film actors
American male television actors
Writers from Brooklyn
American male stage actors
20th-century American male actors
20th-century American writers
21st-century American male actors
21st-century American writers
21st-century American Jews
Academy of Magical Arts Magician of the Year winners